Gorintada railway station (station code: GOTD), is situated on Narasapuram–Bhimavaram branch railway between Narasapuram and Palakollu stations. It is close to National Highway 216 and is a walkable distance from village Digamarru-Kothapeta located on NH 216.

References 

Railway stations on Bhimavaram-Narasapur branch line
Railway stations in West Godavari district
Vijayawada railway division